The 2012–13 Cal State Bakersfield Roadrunners men's basketball team represented California State University, Bakersfield during the 2012–13 NCAA Division I men's basketball season. The Roadrunners, led by second year head coach Rod Barnes, played their home games at the Icardo Center, with four home games at Rabobank Arena, and played as an independent. They finished the season 14–16. This was the Roadrunners last year as an independent as they will join the Western Athletic Conference in July 2013.

Roster

Schedule
The Roadrunners played a series of exhibition games in The Bahamas from September 2–7.

|-
!colspan=9| Regular Season

References

Cal State Bakersfield Roadrunners men's basketball seasons
Cal State Bakersfield